Ron Rich (born 1938 in Pittsburgh, Pennsylvania) is an American actor who played the roles of football player Luther 'Boom Boom' Jackson in the Billy Wilder comedy The Fortune Cookie (1966), and Juno in the film Chubasco (1968).

Selected television work
I Spy (1965, 1967) (two episodes)
Mission Impossible (1968) (double episode)
Julia (1968) (one episode)

References

External links

1938 births
Living people
African-American male actors
American male film actors
American male television actors
21st-century African-American people
20th-century African-American people